The 1995 USISL Professional League was the higher of the two outdoor men's leagues run by the United Systems of Independent Soccer Leagues during the summer of 1995.

Overview
From its beginnings in 1986 as a semi-professional indoor league in the American Southwest, the USISL had grown over the last decade. In 1989, the league added a summer, outdoor competition which had grown in popularity as the indoor league slowly shrank. By 1994, the outdoor season included 69 teams with various levels of professionalism. In 1995, the USISL decided to split the summer schedule into two different leagues, the Professional and the Premier Leagues. The Professional League was fully professional while the Premier League continued to allow amateur and semi-professional teams to compete.

Regular season
 Regulation win = 6 points
 Shootout win (SW) = 4 points
 Shootout loss (SL) = 2 points
 Regulation loss = 0 points
 Bonus points (BP): An additional one point per goal up to a maximum of three points per game.

Northeast Division

Coastal Conference

Capital Conference

Atlantic Division

Midwest Division

East Conference

West Conference

Southeast Division

South Central Division

Western Division

North Conference

South Conference

Northwest Division

Playoffs

Northeast Division

First round

Second round

 According to the available records, the Delaware Wizards defeated the Cape Cod Crusaders 5-4 (SO).

Final

The New York Fever advanced.

Atlantic Division

Final

The teams played a mini-game to decide who advanced after finishing the series tied at one game apiece.

The Myrtle Beach Boyz advanced.

Midwest Division

First round

 The game was suspended late in the match due to darkness.  On August 10th, the league announced the Xoggz and Thoroughbreds would finish their game on August 11th.  The team which won would then immediately play the Milwaukee Rampage in the first game of the second round series.  The Thoroughbreds, facing the requirement to make short-notice travel plans in order to play the last few minutes of the suspended game, then play their "home game" in Columbus in the event they won, chose to forfeit instead.

Second round
 The Midwest Division second round matchups featured two-game series.  All other divisions had single elimination matchups.

The Minnesota Thunder advanced to the Midwest Division final.

The Milwaukee Rampage advanced.

Final

The Minnesota Thunder advanced.

Southeast Division

Final

The Tampa Bay Cyclones advanced.

South Central Division

Final

The New Mexico Chiles advanced to the Sizzlin' Nine Tournament.

Western Division

First round

Second round

Final

The Monterey Bay Jaguars advanced.

Northwest Division

Final

The Hawaii Tsunami advanced.

Sizzlin' Nine Championship
The Sizzlin' Nine Championship was a three-group round robin tournament featuring nine teams.  The Long Island Rough Riders received a bye into the Sizzlin' Nine Championship.  The other eight teams were the seven divisional champions and the divisional finals runner-up with the highest total points during the regular season.  Each of the three groups played at a single location.  The top four teams then advanced to the playoff semifinals.

Group 1

Group 2

 When the game ended in a tie, the referee chose to go directly to penalty kicks because the field had no lights and it was difficult to see.

Group 3

Semi-finals

Final

Points leaders

Honors
 MVP: Giovanni Savarese
 Points leader: Flavio Ferri
 Goals leader: Flavio Ferri
 Assists leader:  Wane Lobring
 Defender of the Year: Troy Edwards
 Goalkeeper of the Year: Jim Adams
 Rookie of the Year: Wellijohn Dominiciano Jr., 
 Coach of the Year: Buzz Lagos
 Organization of the Year: Tampa Bay Cyclones

External links
United Soccer Leagues (RSSSF)
The Year in American Soccer – 1995
1995 USISL Awards
1995 USISL Standings

References

USL Second Division seasons
2